Nickerson may refer to:

People
Nickerson (surname)

Fictional characters
Coach Burt Nickerson, a character in the movie All the Right Moves played by Craig T. Nelson
Marty Nickerson, the main character, a fictional attorney, in the four books written by Rose Connors
Ned Nickerson, boyfriend of Nancy Drew in the Nancy Drew Mystery Stories series

Places

Antarctica
Mount Nickerson, in the Ross Dependency
Nickerson Ice Shelf, in Marie Byrd Land

United States

Communities
listed alphabetically by state
Nickerson, Kansas
Nickerson Township, Pine County, Minnesota
Nickerson, Minnesota
Nickerson Township, Dodge County, Nebraska
Nickerson, Nebraska

Locations
listed alphabetically by name
Nickerson Farms, a former roadside restaurant franchise in the Midwestern United States
Nickerson Field, a sports stadium at Boston University
Nickerson Gardens, a public housing project in Los Angeles
Nickerson House, a Chicago landmark and home to the Driehaus Museum
Nickerson Mansion, a historic house in Brewster, Massachusetts
Nickerson Mountain, a mountain located in Carroll County, New Hampshire
Nickerson State Park, a state park in Massachusetts

See also

Nicholson (disambiguation)
Nickelsen
Nicolson